You Pay Your Money is a 1957 British crime drama film directed by Maclean Rogers and starring Hugh McDermott, Jane Hylton and  Honor Blackman. The thriller was one of the Butcher's Film Service's 1950s B film genre.

Plot
On a visit to Belgium, married couple Bob (Hugh McDermott ) and Susie Westlake (Honor Blackman) become involved with wealthy financier, Steve Mordaunt (Ivan Samson), in the sale and transfer of a collection of rare books. In an attempted burglary at Mordaunt's home, his love interest, Mrs. Rosemary Delgado (Jane Hylton), is suspected. She was once romantically linked to a gangster and she leads the Westlakes in a search for Achemd's writings, a middle eastern 14th Century seer which has inspired an extreme political group, and thought to be in the collection of rare books that Mourdaunt now owns.

The Westlakes become embroiled in a struggle over the valuable Arabic manuscripts, and when Susie is kidnapped by extremists, Bob works as an assistant to Tom Cookson, a manuscript smuggler (Hugh Moxey) who is importing the rare texts the gang are seeking. The extremists demand Mourdaunt turn over his collection of rare books, and plot to incite a revolution across the Middle East but can the Westlakes prevent a serious international situation?

Cast

 Hugh McDermott as Bob Westlake 
 Jane Hylton as Mrs. Rosemary Delgado 
 Honor Blackman as Susie Westlake 
 Hugh Moxey as Tom Cookson 
 Ivan Samson as Steve Mordaunt 
 Ferdy Mayne as Delal 
 Shirley Deane as Doris Squire 
 Gerard Heinz as Dr. Burger 
 Peter Swanwick as Hall Porter 
 Basil Dignam as Currie 
 Fred Griffiths as Fred (Driver)
 Ben Williams as Seymour 
 Elsie Wagstaff as Ada Seymour 
 Vincent Holman as Briggs 
 Mark Daly as Goodwin
 Myles Rudge as Estate Agent
  Jack Taylor as 1st Thug
 Larry Taylor as 2nd Thug 
 Robert Dorning as Birdwatcher 
  Don Qureshi as Arab 
  Lucette Marimar as Telephonist 
  Amando Guinlee as Belgian Seaman
  Shaym Bahadur as Said 
  Shripad Pai as Man 
  George Roderick as Oley Jackson

Production
Principal photography on You Pay Your Money took place in the Nettlefold Studios, Walton-on-Thames, Surrey, England.

Critical reception
In a review of You Pay Your Money, the Radio Times wrote, "The much maligned Butcher's Film Service holds an unenviable place in the history of British cinema. By sponsoring dozens of low-budget programmers, it enabled young talent on both sides of the camera to gain an industry foothold. Yet it mostly churned out dismal offerings such as this tale of kidnap and rare book smuggling, which is given only the merest modicum of respectability by the presence of Hugh McDermott and Honor Blackman."

A review of You Pay Your Money in TV Guide, noted, "... the execution is top notch, but the witlessness of the story rankles."

References

Notes

Bibliography

 Chibnall, Steve and Brian McFarlane. The British 'B' Film. London: Palgrave MacMillan, 2009. .

External links
 

1957 films
British crime drama films
Films directed by Maclean Rogers
1957 crime drama films
1950s English-language films
1950s British films